Richmond Bridge may refer to:

 Richmond Bridge (Tasmania), a bridge in Tasmania, Australia
 Richmond Bridge, London, a bridge in London, England
 Richmond–San Rafael Bridge, a bridge in California, United States